

History
In the 2009 Copa Perú, the club classified to National Stage but was eliminated by Diablos Rojos of Puno in the quarterfinals.

Honours

National
Región VII:
Runner-up (1): 2009

Liga Departamental de Tacna:
Winners (2): 2010, 2018
 Runner-up (1): 2009

See also
List of football clubs in Peru
Peruvian football league system

External links
Ugarte no hay uno solo

Football clubs in Peru
Association football clubs established in 2003
2003 establishments in Peru